Agnack Petit is a village the Ziguinchor Department of the Ziguinchor Region in the Basse Casmance area of southern Senegal.

In the 2002 census the population was counted as 1212 inhabitants in 169 households.

References

Populated places in the Ziguinchor Department
Casamance